Lisa Raymond and Samantha Stosur were the defending champions, and successfully defended their title, beating Vania King and Rennae Stubbs 7–6(6), 3–6, 7–5 in the final.

Seeds

 Lisa Raymond   Samantha Stosur (champions)
 Yan Zi   Zheng Jie (semifinals)
 Daniela Hantuchová   Ai Sugiyama (first round)
 Meghann Shaughnessy   Vera Zvonareva (first round)

Draw

Draw

Notes
The winners will receive $54,540 and 430 ranking points.
The runners-up will receive $29,350 and 300 ranking points.
The last direct acceptance team was Emma Laine/Anastassia Rodionova (combined ranking of 120th).
The player representative was Akiko Morigami.

External links
Draw

Pan Pacific Open
Toray Pan Pacific Open
2007 Toray Pan Pacific Open